Collège Jeanne-Sauvé (CJS) is a French-immersion high school in Winnipeg, Manitoba, and the first French-immersion high school in western Canada.

Situated in the southern St. Vital area of Winnipeg, Manitoba, it is part of the Louis Riel School Division. The high school runs from grades 9 to 12, and is named in honor of the former governor-general of Canada, Jeanne Sauvé.

History 
Collège Jeanne-Sauvé was the first French-immersion high school in western Canada. It was created as a result of the efforts of parents to ensure that their children be able to continue in French immersion after grade 8. The school was finally opened in January 1990 for grades 6 through 11. Its name was chosen to recognize the distinct ability that former Governor General of Canada Jeanne Sauvé had to bridge the gap between English and French communities, one of the main goals of French immersion. Sauvé was invited to the official opening of the school, which took place on March 1, 1990. While she was unable to attend, she kept her promise to visit the school: Sauvé visited Collège Jeanne-Sauvé for the entire school day on October 5, 1990, where she spoke to students and staff and visited classrooms in the school.

Feeder schools 

The schools whose students generally enroll in Collège Jeanne-Sauvé are École St. Germain, École Julie-Riel, École Marie-Anne-Gaboury, École George McDowell, and École Varennes. There are also students who come from other French schools within the community.

Notable alumni 
 Gabby May, artistic gymnast
 Andrea Slobodian, reporter
 Sami Jo Small, Canadian national women's hockey team goaltender

References

External links
Louis Riel School Division

High schools in Manitoba
Educational institutions established in 1989
1989 establishments in Manitoba
St. Vital, Winnipeg